Francine Bergé (born 21 July 1938, Neuilly-sur-Seine, Hauts-de-Seine, France) is a French film and stage actress.

Filmography

Theater

Awards 
 2018 - Prix du Brigadier d’honneur
 2016 - Molière Award, Best Actress in a Public Theatre, for Bettencourt boulevard
 2013 - Palmarès du théâtre, Honorary Award
 2003 - Molière Award - Nominated for Best Actress for Jeux de scène
 1970 - Prix du Syndicat de la critique, Best Actress for Bérénice

References

External links
 

1938 births
Living people
People from Neuilly-sur-Seine
French film actresses
French stage actresses
French National Academy of Dramatic Arts alumni